Owghaz may refer to:
Owghaz Kohneh
Owghaz Tazeh